Robert Charles Hildyard (1800 – 7 December 1857) was a British Conservative politician.

Hildyard was first elected Conservative MP for Whitehaven at the 1847 general election and held the seat until his death in 1857.

References

External links
 

Conservative Party (UK) MPs for English constituencies
UK MPs 1847–1852
UK MPs 1852–1857
UK MPs 1857–1859
1800 births
1857 deaths